Jing An Kerry Centre, or Jing'an Kerry Centre, is an integrated commercial complex situated at No. 1515 Nanjing Road West in Jing'an District, Shanghai, China. The complex comprises three skyscrapers: Towers 1,2, and 3. The   complex features an  retail space,  of office space, the Jing An Shangri-La,  (133 units) of residential space, and a  underground car park with 1,340 parking spaces.

As of 2020, Tower 2 is the 24th tallest building in Shanghai, and Tower 3 is the 77th tallest building.

Transportation 
Jing An Kerry Centre is connected to both Shanghai Metro Line 2 and Line 7 (Jing'an Temple Station).

See also

 List of shopping malls in China
 List of tallest buildings in Shanghai

References

External links
 
 

1998 establishments in China
2013 establishments in China
Buildings and structures completed in 1998
Buildings and structures completed in 2013
Jing'an District
Shopping malls in Shanghai
Skyscrapers in Shanghai